The Under Armour High School All-America Baseball Game is a high school baseball all-star game held annually to spotlight the United States' top high school players who are juniors or seniors. The game is played in late July or August, at Wrigley Field in Chicago.

Since 2008 and through the 2018 Major League Baseball draft, 318 of the 361 draft-eligible players from the game have been selected in the MLB draft, including 98 first round picks.

History
The game was first played in 2005 as the Cape Cod High School Baseball Classic presented by Under Armour (or simply the Cape Cod High School Classic) and was played at Spillane Field in Wareham, Massachusetts. Since 2008, Under Armour has served as the title sponsor, with the game hosted at Wrigley Field and enjoying a national audience. Under Armour and the Chicago Cubs have a partnership that preexists Under Armour's title sponsorship. Baseball Factory and Team One Baseball have been involved in both versions of the event, with a committee of their scouts selecting players for each year's game.

For several years starting in 2009, Cal Ripken served as the official ambassador of the game. In 2014, Kyler Murray became the first athlete to play in both the Under Armour All-America Baseball Game and the Under Armour All-America Football Game. Through January 2019, Murray, A. J. Brown, Jerrion Ealy, and Maurice Hampton are the only players to appear in both games. At least three Canadian players have appeared in the game; Phillippe Aumont in 2006, Jake Eliopoulos in 2008, and Evan Rutckyj in 2009.

The game is usually played on a Saturday, with related events beginning several days before, including a home run derby. In 2017, the game celebrated its 10th anniversary of title sponsorship by Under Armour; it was decided in extra innings and featured a walk-off hit, both firsts in the game's history, and was won by the American team, 2–1 in 11 innings.

Game results

Note: games broadcast on MLB Network are usually streamed on MLB.com

Notable alumni

2005

Brandon Belt
Charles Brewer
Adrian Cárdenas
Jon Edwards
Erik Goeddel
Ryan Jackson
Kasey Kiker
Aaron Miller
Chris Parmelee
Cory Rasmus
Devin Shepherd
Shawn Tolleson

Source:

2006
Phillippe Aumont
Anthony Rizzo
Josh Vitters
Source:

2007

Zack Cox
L. J. Hoes
Casey Kelly
Source:

2008

Bobby Borchering
Mychal Givens
Brian Goodwin
Matt Purke
Max Stassi
Donavan Tate
Jacob Turner

Source:

2009

Stetson Allie
Nicholas Castellanos
A. J. Cole
Evan Rutckyj
Austin Wilson

Source:

2010

Dante Bichette Jr.
Nick Burdi
Rookie Davis
Brandon Nimmo
Addison Russell
Bubba Starling

Source:

2011

Lewis Brinson
Byron Buxton
Gavin Cecchini
Clint Coulter
Carson Kelly
Yairo Muñoz
Franmil Reyes
David Thompson
Stryker Trahan
Nick Travieso
Jesmuel Valentín

Source:

2012

Trey Ball
Clint Frazier
Billy McKinney
Austin Meadows
Dominic Smith
Justin Williams

Source:

2013

Daz Cameron
Dylan Cease
Greg Deichmann
Luke Dykstra
Jake Gatewood
Michael Gettys
Nick Gordon
Foster Griffin
Monte Harrison
Grant Holmes
Alex Jackson
Tyler Kolek
Michael Kopech
Alex Lange
Corbin Martin
David Peterson
Touki Toussaint
Alex Verdugo

Source:

2014

Luken Baker
Seth Beer
Beau Burrows
Daz Cameron
Kody Clemens
Gray Fenter
Ke'Bryan Hayes
Ryan Mountcastle
Kyler Murray
Josh Naylor
Mike Nikorak
Demi Orimoloye
Nick Plummer
Cal Raleigh
Austin Riley
Brendan Rodgers
Ashe Russell
Cole Sands
Nick Shumpert
Kyle Tucker

Source:

2015

Jo Adell
Seth Beer
Will Benson
Bo Bichette
Hunter Bishop
A. J. Brown
Dylan Carlson
Thomas Dillard
Grae Kessinger
Carter Kieboom
Jesús Luzardo
Alek Manoah
Kyle Muller
Delvin Pérez
Riley Pint
Graeme Stinson
Taylor Trammell
Colton Welker
Joey Wentz
Forrest Whitley
Andy Yerzy

Source:

2016

Jo Adell
Nick Allen
Shane Baz
Tanner Burns
Triston Casas
Hans Crouse
Hagen Danner
Jake Eder
Hunter Greene
DL Hall
Royce Lewis
MJ Melendez
Garrett Mitchell
Nick Pratto
Heliot Ramos
Ryan Vilade
Drew Waters

Source:

2017

Jordyn Adams
Triston Casas
Slade Cecconi
Mason Denaburg
J. T. Ginn
Nolan Gorman
Joe Gray Jr.
Jordan Groshans
Ethan Hankins
Jaden Hill
Rece Hinds
Jeremiah Jackson
Jarred Kelenic
Matthew Liberatore
Noah "Bo" Naylor
Kumar Rocker
Alek Thomas
Ryan Weathers
Cole Wilcox
Cole Winn

Source:

2018

 C. J. Abrams
 Matthew Allan
 Hunter Barco
 Corbin Carroll
 Daniel Espino
 Jud Fabian
 Riley Greene
 Gunnar Henderson 
 Rece Hinds
 Jared Jones
 Spencer Jones
 Jack Leiter
 Brennan Malone
 Quinn Priester
 Matthew Thompson
 Anthony Volpe
 Bobby Witt Jr.
 Carter Young

Source:

2019

 Dylan Crews
 Pete Crow-Armstrong
 Robert Hassell
 Austin Hendrick
 Ed Howard
 Jared Jones
 Blaze Jordan
 Jared Kelley
 Coby Mayo
 Robert Moore
 Andrew Painter
 Drew Romo
 Nate Savino
 Daniel Susac
 Zac Veen
 Cayden Wallace

Source:

See also
Baseball awards#U.S. high-school baseball

References

External links
Official website at Baseball Factory

All-star games
High school sports in Illinois
Baseball in Illinois
2008 establishments in Illinois
2005 establishments in Massachusetts